Eric Korita and Mike Leach were the defending champions, but did not participate together this year.  Korita partnered Brad Pearce, losing in the first round.  Leach did not participate this year.

Andrew Castle and Roberto Saad won in the final 6–7, 6–4, 7–6, against Gary Donnelly and Jim Grabb.

Seeds

  Brad Drewett /  John Fitzgerald (first round)
  Gary Donnelly /  Jim Grabb (final)
  Andy Kohlberg /  Robert Van't Hof (semifinals)
  Kelly Jones /  Tim Pawsat (semifinals)

Draw

Draw

References

External links
 Draw

Doubles